Nahan Assembly constituency is one of the 68 assembly constituencies of Himachal Pradesh a northern Indian state. Nahan is also part of Shimla Lok Sabha constituency.

Members of Legislative Assembly

Election candidate

2022

Election results

2017

See also
 List of constituencies of the Himachal Pradesh Legislative Assembly
 Nahan
 Sirmaur district

References

External links
 

Sirmaur district
Assembly constituencies of Himachal Pradesh